Aleksandar Stavrev (North Macedonia: Александар Ставрев; born 30 March 1977 in Skopje) is a Macedonian football referee. He refereed at 2012–13 UEFA Champions League.

Stavrev became a FIFA referee in 2006. He has officiated in 2010 and 2014 World Cup qualifiers.

References

External links 
 
 
 

1977 births
Living people
Sportspeople from Skopje
Macedonian football referees
UEFA Champions League referees